José Larduet Gómez (born February 23, 1990 in Santiago de Cuba) is a Cuban amateur boxer best known for winning light-heavyweight bronze at the 2009 World Amateur Boxing Championships.

In November 2008 he won gold at the 2008 Youth World Amateur Boxing Championships.

He added a Cuban Senior title in January 2009 (held at Playa Giron).

At the 2009 World Amateur Boxing Championships he won bronze after being edged by Russian favorite Artur Beterbiyev 6:10.

Heavyweight
At the 2011 World Amateur Boxing Championships he lost his quarterfinal 20:24 to Teymur Mammadov but qualified for the Olympics.

At the 2012 Summer Olympics he lost to Clemente Russo in the quarter finals.

References

External links
 All results (see bottom, by year)
 WorldChamps2009

1990 births
Living people
Cuban male boxers
Light-heavyweight boxers
Olympic boxers of Cuba
Boxers at the 2012 Summer Olympics
AIBA World Boxing Championships medalists
Central American and Caribbean Games gold medalists for Cuba
Competitors at the 2018 Central American and Caribbean Games
People from Santiago de Cuba
Central American and Caribbean Games medalists in boxing
21st-century Cuban people